Mohammad-Qoli Khan Qajar was an Iranian military leader and official, who served as the governor (beglarbeg) of Karabakh and Ganja in 1616-1627 and 1633. He was a son of the previous governor of Karabakh, Mohammad-Khan Qajar (1606–1616), and a member of the Ziyādoghlu branch of the Turkoman Qajar clan. Around 1620, when Paykar Khan Igirmi Durt was given a sister of Lohrasb (Luarsab II of Kartli) by then incumbent king Abbas I (r. 1588-1629) on the occasion of him being appointed as the new governor of Kakheti, Mohammad-Qoli Khan Qajar was given a sister of Tahmuras Khan (Teimuraz I of Kakheti). When in 1624, king Abbas I married his granddaughter to Semayun Khan (Simon II), Abd-ol-Ghaffar's wife was a companion to the bride, while Mohammad-Qoli Khan Qajar ordered Paykar Khan Igirmi Durt to host the banquet in the second term of the wedding party.

References

Sources
 
  
 
 

17th-century deaths
Safavid governors of Karabakh
Safavid governors of Ganja
Iranian Turkmen people
Safavid generals
Qajar tribe
17th-century people of Safavid Iran